Flybe (pronounced ), styled as flybe, was a British airline based in Exeter, England. Until its sale to Connect Airways in 2019, it was the largest independent regional airline in Europe. Flybe once provided more than half of UK domestic flights outside London.

The airline was launched in 1979 as Jersey European Airways following the merger of Intra Airways and Express Air Services. In 1983, the airline was sold to Walker Steel Group, which also owned Spacegrand Aviation, and the two airlines were merged under the Jersey European name during 1985. The airline experienced significant growth during the 1990s; it was in this period that Jersey European Airways served as the launch customer for the Embraer E-195 regional airliner. The firm was renamed British European in 2000 and Flybe in 2002. On 3 November 2006, it was announced that Flybe was in the process of purchasing BA Connect, which resulted in the airline becoming the largest regional airline in Europe. On 10 December 2010, the company was floated in an IPO on the London Stock Exchange.

In February 2019, the airline was sold to the Connect Airways consortium, backed by Virgin Atlantic and Stobart Aviation. Connect Airways intended Flybe and Stobart Air to subsequently rebrand as Virgin Connect, though they would have retained their own Air Operator Certificates.

On 5 March 2020, Flybe filed for administration and ceased all operations. The airline, which had been struggling for several months, claimed that its difficulties were compounded by the impact of the COVID-19 pandemic on bookings. 

In October 2020, Thyme Opco, a company linked to former shareholder Cyrus Capital, reached an agreement with the administrators to purchase the Flybe brand and relaunch the airline in 2021, subject to regulatory approvals. In April 2021, the new company renamed itself Flybe Limited, obtained an operating licence, route licences and airport slots; the first flight took place on 13 April 2022. The relaunched airline ceased trading on 28 January 2023.

History

Early years

Flybe started operations on 1 November 1979 as Jersey European Airways as a result of a merger of the Jersey-based Intra Airways and the Bournemouth-based Express Air Services. It was founded by John Habin, a resident of Jersey and the majority investor. After selling Aviation Beauport and other business interests, Habin invested in the firm so that it could establish several routes from Jersey Airport to major airports in the UK. Initially equipped with an aging fleet of war-surplus Douglas DC-3 aircraft, Jersey European Airways gradually reequipped with more modern commuter airliners.

In November 1983, Habin sold his stake in Jersey European Airways to Jack Walker's Walker Steel Group, which already owned the Blackpool-based charter airline Spacegrand Aviation. Initially, these two airlines were then run separately despite partially shared management; Exeter Airport served as a critical hub, forming a meeting point between the two companies' route networks. In 1985, both airlines were amalgamated under the Jersey European name; the combined entity's headquarters was established at Exeter. In 1985, Jersey European Airways carried 160,000 passengers and achieved an annual revenue of just under £9million.

During 1990, Jersey European Airways' passenger count rose to 460,000, being 40 percent greater than the previous year. During 1991, the airline commenced its first route to London, flying between Guernsey and London Gatwick Airport. In 1993, it received the first of its British Aerospace 146, a four-engined jet-powered regional aircraft. That same year, the airline introduced a business class service aboard some aircraft. Around this time, the Exeter hub was supplemented by connections at both London and Birmingham. By 1995, Jersey European Airways was again expanding after incurring minor losses during the prior year.

In mid-1997, Jersey European Airways announced that it had achieved record results in its previous financial year amid a boom in Europe's regional airlines market; that year, the firm had secured a franchise arrangement with Air France covering routes from London Heathrow to Toulouse and Lyon, expanded its fleet to provide 32% more seat capacity, recorded a 27% increase in sales, while profits had risen by nearly a third to reach £3.4 million. That same year, the airline, which operated a mixed fleet of 12 British Aerospace 146s, four Fokker F27s and two Short 360s, was in the process of leasing additional BAe 146s to cater for expansion; Jim French, Jersey European's deputy chief executive, announced that it was performing detailed studies with the aim of introducing larger airliners in the 150- to 170-seat class, such as the Boeing 737 and Airbus A320 families.

2000–2010
In June 2000, the airline announced that it had rebranded itself British European; according to a company spokesperson, this was due to the Jersey European Airways name no longer being an accurate reflection of the scope of the routes being covered. This name was soon shortened to simply Flybe on 18 July 2002, after which the airline repositioning itself as a full-service, low-fare airline. Various pricing and product changes were made in line with this position, such as discounted one-way tickets, the abolition of overbooking practices, a customer charter of the airline's service standards, as well as compensation for delays.

In June 2005, it was announced that Flybe would procure a fleet of 26 Embraer E-195 regional airliners; it would claim that it had opted for the 118-seat E-195 over rival 150-seat aircraft due to economics and performance benefits. Flybe would serve as the launch customer for the E-195, receiving the first example of the type during the later half of 2006. Initially, the E-195 fleet were assigned to the airline's high-volume trunk routes, but the firm later planned to use it on new routes to expand their network. Further E-195s would be ordered by the airline over the following decade, the type making up a major proportion of Flybe's fleet.

On 3 November 2006, it was announced that Flybe would buy BA Connect, except for that airline's services out of London City Airport. During March 2007, this takeover was completed; as a consequence of the BA Connect takeover, the ownership of Flybe was divided between Rosedale Aviation Holdings (69%), Flybe staff (16%) and the International Airlines Group (15%). The acquisition increased Flybe's route network in both the UK and continental Europe, making Flybe Europe's largest regional airline.

On 14 January 2008, it was announced that Flybe had signed a franchise agreement with Scottish airline Loganair, to commence on 26 October 2008 following the termination of Loganair's franchise agreement with British Airways on 25 October 2008.  The agreement would see Loganair aircraft flying in Flybe colours on 55 routes from Scotland.

In 2008, in order to avoid losing a £280,000 rebate from Norwich Airport, Flybe advertised for "actors", as well as offering free return flights to Dublin on its website. As a result, the environmental group Friends of the Earth called on the government to launch an investigation into the aviation industry.

Chief Executive Officer Jim French was recognised in the 2009 Queen's Birthday Honours List with a CBE for his services to the airline industry.

On 10 December 2010, Flybe floated in an IPO on the London Stock Exchange, with trading in shares commencing on the same day. Full public release of shares followed on 15 December 2010. The share price was set at 295p, valuing the company at approximately £215million, and raising £66million for the company, half of which was to pay for fleet expansion.

2011–2020
On 23 May 2013, it was reported that Flybe had sold its slots at Gatwick Airport to EasyJet for £20million, and that the slots would be handed over to EasyJet on 29 March 2014. CEO and chairman Jim French retired in August 2013, leaving the post of CEO to Saad Hammad, formerly of EasyJet, while Simon Laffin became chairman. By November 2013, Hammad had shaken up the operation, requesting the resignations of three top managers within six weeks of his arrival. Out of 158 routes flown at the time, over 60 did not cover their direct operating expenses and the costs of crew and aircraft.

On 23 April 2014, Flybe announced that it would launch domestic and international flights from London City Airport from 27 October 2014 after signing a five-year deal with the airport. The airline was expecting to carry around 500,000 passengers a year, with all five allocated aircraft being based around the Flybe network overnight. In March 2014, it was announced that Flybe would undergo a major brand refresh. This new scheme included a new purple aircraft livery, new interior features and new uniforms. During June 2014, British Airways sold most of its remaining stake in the airline; it had already been reduced to 5% by share issues.

In early 2016, it was announced that Flybe had negotiated a six-year agreement with SAS Scandinavian Airlines to fly 4 ATR 72–9 aircraft on their behalf, starting in October 2016. On 4 March 2015, Flybe announced new routes from Cardiff Airport bringing the number of routes to eleven.  Flybe also stated their intention to create a new base at Cardiff Airport in summer 2015, initially basing two Embraer 195 aircraft there, which subsequently increased to three. On 10 November 2015, Flybe announced that it would base two Embraer 195 aircraft at Doncaster Sheffield Airport, starting new routes to Amsterdam, Berlin Tegel, Paris CDG, Jersey, Alicante, Málaga, Faro and Newquay . This announcement came on the same day that Flybe announced that they would be pulling flights from Bournemouth Airport. Dublin Airport was added in October 2016, taking over where Stobart Air pulled out.

On 26 October 2016, it was announced that Hammad would be standing down as CEO with immediate effect and that consequently, Flybe were beginning the process of finding a replacement. On 21 November 2016, Flybe announced it was to open its first European base at Düsseldorf Airport. In February 2017 this commenced with two aircraft alongside 60 pilots, cabin crew and engineers. On 22 December 2016, Flybe started selling flights for 12 further destinations from Southend Airport, in an extension to their existing franchise operation with Stobart Air.

Flybe and Loganair separately announced that their franchise agreement would terminate in October 2017. Flybe then announced a partnership with Eastern Airways and would now operate routes in direct competition with Loganair – namely flights from the Scottish mainland to Stornoway, Kirkwall and Sumburgh. On 16 January 2017, former CityJet boss Christine Ourmieres-Widener, took over the role of CEO after Saad Hammad left in October 2016. Later in the year, Flybe started flying from Heathrow to Aberdeen and Edinburgh taking over slots previously used by Virgin Atlantic Little Red.

On 22 February 2018, franchise partner Stobart Air confirmed interest in a takeover bid of 100% of Flybe for an undisclosed fee. However this bid was rejected by the carrier and Stobart scrapped its interest on 22 March 2018, causing share prices in the airline, which had climbed by up to 25% following the bid, to drop back to their previous level. In September 2018, a revised aircraft livery was launched, with purple and white being retained but lilac replacing the red and yellow. On 14 November 2018, after the airline's shares fell by 75%, Flybe announced that it was talking with various parties about a potential sale of the business, as part of a wide-ranging review of strategic options. On 22 November, it emerged that Virgin Atlantic was one of the parties with which Flybe had been holding discussions; Flybe's slots at Heathrow were of particular interest to Virgin Atlantic, along with the potential to use Flybe to feed passengers into the Virgin Atlantic hubs at Manchester and London Heathrow.

Connect Airways takeover
On 11 January 2019, a takeover bid worth £2.2million by the Connect Airways consortium, which includes Virgin Atlantic and Stobart Aviation, was confirmed. The consortium would initially lend £20million to enable Flybe to continue operations, and would also take over Stobart Air; after the acquisition is complete it will provide a further £80million. This initial deal, which would have been conditional on shareholder and court approval, was expected to be completed by the second quarter of 2019. Flybe and Stobart Air would subsequently operate under the Virgin Atlantic brand though they would retain their own Air Operator Certificates. Optimisation of Flybe's routes is likely to result in a "limited reduction" in its fleet.

On 15 January 2019, Connect Airways increased its offer by £600,000, and set out improved bridging loan conditions, with £10million to be released immediately to support Flybe's business, and a further £10million available. Subsequent funding of £80million was also confirmed. In accepting the revised offer, Flybe's board stated that it provides the security that the business needs and preserves the interests of its stakeholders, customers, employees, partners, and pension members. The deal, which covered Flybe Group's operating subsidiaries, i.e. the airline and the website, is to be completed by 22 February 2019.

Flybe Group's shareholders had decided in December 2018 to transfer its final shares to a standard listing, meaning that shareholder approval for the sale of the assets was no longer required. Notwithstanding this change, on 21 January 2019 one of the largest shareholders, Hosking Partners, threatened legal action to block the deal, which it believed undervalued the company. On 4 February 2019, Flybe confirmed that it had received a valid request from Hosking Partners to convene a general meeting in order to appoint a new director, but noted that Flybe's articles of association did not give members the powers needed for the new director's proposed investigation of the sale. It also confirmed that it had received, and rejected, a preliminary alternative bid from former Stobart CEO Andrew Tinkler. On 7 February, Flybe Group warned its shareholders that, after the sale of the operating assets, the parent company would be wound up if they did not approve its sale. On 20 February, Flybe said it had rejected an alternative "preliminary and highly conditional contingency proposal" from Mesa Air Group and supported by Andrew Tinkler, noting that it could not be executed quickly enough to enable the airline to continue trading.

On 21 February 2019, Flybe announced that the sale of Flybe Limited and Flybe.com Limited to Connect Airways had been completed, with Flybe flights continuing to operate as normal. The sale of the parent company, Flybe Group plc, now an empty shell,  was confirmed by its shareholders at a meeting on 4 March and became effective on 11 March.

In October 2019, it was announced that Flybe was to be rebranded as Virgin Connect, reflecting its incorporation into the Virgin Group, with effect from early 2020. The Virgin Group launched a landing page  to avoid confusion with the existing Virgin Connect brand used in Russia for internet & mobile services.

In January 2020, it emerged that Flybe was again in difficulties, incurring mounting losses despite the financing provided by Connect Airways. A deal was reached on 15 January, entailing a deferred payment plan for Flybe's tax debts and increased funding from Connect Airways. The UK government also agreed to conduct an urgent review of Air Passenger Duty on domestic flights. As of January 2020, Flybe operated 36% of all UK domestic flights (ahead of the UK's two largest airlines, British Airways and EasyJet), carrying 26% of domestic passengers (behind British Airways and EasyJet, which operate larger aircraft types).

In February 2020, the UK government envisaged granting Flybe a £100million rescue loan, and held talks with the EU Commission to ensure that state aid rules were not broken. In early March, the airline faced concern over the impact of the COVID-19 pandemic on bookings, casting doubt on whether the loan would be granted.

End of operations

In the early morning of 5 March 2020, the airline filed for administration and ceased all operations with immediate effect after the UK government failed to grant a proposed £100million ($129million) loan. Virgin Atlantic stated that Connect Airways could "no longer commit to continued financial support" despite its investment of over £135million, and placed part of the blame on the negative impact of the COVID-19 pandemic on Flybe's trading. All flights operated by Flybe and Stobart Air were cancelled, though those operated by franchisees Blue Islands and Eastern Airways continued. The chief executive, Mark Anderson, said that Flybe had made "every possible attempt" to prevent the collapse but were "unable to overcome significant funding challenges".

As of 1 May 2020, Flybe's administrators EY believed that a sale of the business as a going concern remained possible, having received around 20 non-binding offers including three for the entire business and assets, and expected to receive final offers for evaluation in early May. They appealed to the UK transport secretary to ensure that Flybe's operating licence is not revoked, as this would prevent the sale of the valuable airport slots. The appeal was successful, and on 9 July the CAA withdrew its revocation decision. Further legal action remained, relating to Flybe's slots at Heathrowwhich have been taken over by British Airways parent IAGand to its Air Operator Certificate.

Relaunch

On 19 October 2020, reports emerged that Lucien Farrell, in charge of former shareholder Cyrus Capital's European office, had formed a new company, Thyme Opco, to purchase the Flybe brand and relaunch the airline, subject to regulatory approvals. The new owner planned to "start small and restore regional connectivity in the UK" from 2021. On 1 December 2020, Thyme Opco applied for a UK operating licence. 
Thyme Opco also registered a 21-year-old Q400, which was expected to be the first aircraft for the 'new Flybe', but which has since departed to Canada where it operates for PAL Airlines.

In April 2021, the British CAA granted the new airline an operating licence as well as Type A and B route licences, enabling the carrier to operate both charter and scheduled services. The new company also obtained 86 slots at Heathrow for the summer 2021 season, to be used for flights to Edinburgh and Aberdeen, but the airline was not relaunched in time to use these slots.

The 'original' Flybe company was renamed FBE Realisations 2021 Limited, with Thyme Opco Limited becoming Flybe Limited.

On 3 June 2021, the operating licence for the original company was revoked following an unsuccessful appeal to the Transport Secretary. Despite initial beliefs that its legacy slots at UK airports had returned to the slot coordinator, this was shown not to be the case by coordinator ACL. The new operating company also leased Heathrow slots from British Airways for routes to Edinburgh and Aberdeen.

On 26 October 2021, the new Flybe Limited confirmed that it had appointed David Pflieger as its chief executive. This closely followed the appearance of an ex-Flybe Q400, registered as G-JECX, which had been painted with a new purple-and-white livery. In November 2021, the airline announced that it had picked Birmingham Airport as its new base, with operations scheduled to begin in early 2022 to "key regions across the UK and EU".

On 16 March 2022, Flybe announced that it would start ticket sales the following week, and that Belfast would be the airline's second operating base. The company slogan was "Smile and go the extra mile." On 22 March the company's website opened for bookings; the first flight took place on 13 April 2022.

On 28 January 2023, Flybe entered administration and ceased all operations.

Corporate affairs

Ownership and structure

The former owner, Flybe Group plc, was a public company listed on the London Stock Exchange. Until November 2013, the main shareholder, with 48.1% of the shares, was Rosedale Aviation Holdings Limited, the corporate representative of the trustee of the Jack Walker 1987 Settlement, which was established by the late Jack Walker, who was involved in Flybe's early development.

In the UK, Flybe's largest base was at Birmingham Airport; the airline had other large bases at Belfast City, Manchester and Southampton airports, with a total of 14 crew and aircraft who were based across the United Kingdom, the Channel Islands and the Isle of Man. The airline held a Civil Aviation Authority Type A Operating Licence permitting it to carry passengers, cargo and mail on aircraft with 20 or more seats. The Flybe Group included Flybe Aviation Services (engineering and maintenance), Flybe Training Academy (engineering and flight crew training), Flybe UK (airline operations) and Flybe Europe, the holding company for all European operations, which previously consisted of Flybe Nordic.

Business trends
Trends for Flybe Group during the period 2007–2018 are shown below (as at year ending 31 March):

Joint ventures and franchises

Loganair was the first franchise partner for Flybe and operated a number of flights in Scotland and Ireland under a franchise agreement from 2008. Loganair aircraft wore the full Flybe livery during the time of the franchise. In 2016, it was announced that the agreement was to end on 31 August 2017 at which time Loganair would become an independent carrier.

In 2014, Flybe signed their second franchise agreement with Stobart Air, and initially started operating European routes from Southend Airport. In 2015, Stobart Air began operating more flights on behalf of Flybe from Ronaldsway Airport, Isle of Man using two ATR 72. In 2017, Flybe and Stobart Air began operating additional services from Southend Airport using Flybe Embraer 195 jet aircraft.

On 11 January 2016, Flybe announced its third franchise deal with the Jersey based airline, Blue Islands. This would see all Blue Islands flights operated under the Flybe name, and the Blue Islands aircraft livery replaced with the current Flybe livery from May 2016. This deal was, however, under investigation and was reported to be potentially breaking local competition laws.

From 1 September 2017, Eastern Airways became a new franchise partner for Flybe taking over routes previously operated by Loganair from Aberdeen Airport, Glasgow Airport and Edinburgh Airport. This now meant both Flybe and Loganair were now in direct competition with each other. In January 2018, services to Sumburgh were being withdrawn, owing to the competition with Loganair and the route being unable to sustain two carriers. It was also announced that Loganair was withdrawing services from Glasgow to Manchester leaving Flybe as the sole operator on that route.

Flybe purchased Finncomm Airlines with Finnair in July 2011, and on 30 October 2011 rebranded the airline as Flybe Nordic. The joint venture operated its own routes along with franchise routes under a codeshare agreement for Finnair, operating under Flybe's BE-code. Flybe agreed to sell its 60% stake in Flybe Nordic in November 2014 for €1, in an attempt to reduce group costs. On 1 May 2015, Flybe Nordic began operating solely for Finnair as it was no longer a part of Flybe. Flybe Nordic is now known as Nordic Regional Airlines – Norra.

Sponsorship
Flybe were the main sponsor of Exeter City Football Club and also sponsored Exeter Chiefs with their branding featuring on both teams' shirts. Flybe had also sponsored the ITV Weather forecasts on ITV Channel Television, ITV Cymru Wales, ITV Meridian, ITV West Country, STV, UTV, and the sport sections of the Manchester Evening News, the Express & Echo (Exeter), the South Wales Echo (Cardiff), the Isle of Man Courier and the Isle of Man Examiner.

Flybe had previously sponsored Birmingham City (2003–2007), Norwich City (2006–2008), Southampton (2006–2010) and Inverness Caledonian Thistle (2007–2010).

Services

Frequent-flyer programmes
Flybe used the Avios frequent-flyer programme until 30 April 2019, when Flybe and Avios ended their partnership and all accounts were closed. The programme is operated by the IAG subsidiary Avios Group.

Cabin and service
Flybe's cabin interiors were configured with a single-class all-economy layout. Flybe operated an allocated seating policy on all flights. Passengers had the option to choose a specific seat of their choice online in advance for a fee or have one allocated free of charge during online check-in or at the airport check-in. The airline operated a buy on board programme, called "Café Flybe", offering food and drinks for purchase. On most flights to and from the Channel Islands a selection of duty free spirits and tobacco items were also available to purchase.

Passengers had the option of three ticket types. "Just Fly", "Get More" and "All In".
 "Just Fly" was the most basic ticket type, with just the flight included and any extra options available to add for an additional fee.
 "Get More" ticket holders were able to reserve a seat and take a 23 kg hold bag.
 "All In" ticket holders received a complimentary drink and snack, access to Flybe Executive Lounges, free pre-booked seating, priority check-in and two hold bags.

Destinations

Flybe operated short haul services to destinations throughout the United Kingdom, Republic of Ireland and continental Europe.

Former partnerships and codeshare agreements
Flybe formerly had codeshares with the following airlines under the 'One Stop to the World' programme:

 Aer Lingus
 Air France
 Air India
 Alitalia
 British Airways
 Cathay Pacific
 Emirates
 Etihad Airways
 Finnair
 Loganair
 Singapore Airlines
 United Airlines
 Virgin Atlantic

The airline also had franchise agreements with the following airlines:

 Blue Islands
 Eastern Airways
 Loganair (agreement ended 2017)
 Stobart Air

Interline agreements 
Flybe had interline agreements with the following airlines:
 Pakistan International Airlines

Fleet

Before ceasing operations the Flybe fleet consisted of the following aircraft:

Fleet strategy and developments

Flybe retired its final Embraer 195s in February 2020, which were subsequently returned to lessors once retired. Flybe had stated the Q400 was to remain the backbone of its fleet going forward.

Dash 8 Q400

Flybe became the world's largest operator of the Dash 8 Q400 after it added 24 leased from Republic Airways in 2014. In May 2007, the airline signed a deal with Bombardier for a further 15 Q400 aircraft valued at US$394million (£197million), with options for a further 15, increasing its fleet of the type to 60. In September 2014, Republic Airways agreed to lease 24 of their Q400 aircraft to Flybe with delivery over two years starting from March 2018. In June 2017, Flybe announced that due to a loss of near to £20million, it would retire six Q400 aircraft from 2017.

When Flybe collapsed in March 2020 all of its 54 Dash 8 Q400s were placed into storage.

In January 2021, Canadian aerial firefighting specialist Conair Group announced that it had purchased 11 of Flybe's Q400 for conversion into water bombers and multi-role firefighting aircraft.

Embraer 175

On 20 July 2010, Flybe placed an order for 35 Embraer 175 aircraft worth US$1.3 billion (£850million), with options for 65 more (value $2.3billionn/£1.5billion) and purchase rights for a further 40 (value $1.4billion/£0.9billion). The 88-seat aircraft was originally planned to be delivered between July 2011 and March 2017, with the first two aircraft actually arriving in November 2011. In September 2014, Flybe reached an agreement with Embraer to cancel 20 orders for the E-175 jets, and defer delivery of the other four until further notice. 

In 2020 Flybe's nine E175 were transferred to various lessors when they collapsed. Six of the aircraft that had been acquired brand new fell into the hands of a Bermudan company by the name Flybe leasing, with one other going to CAW Finance Corp.

Embraer 195

The airline placed an order for 14 Embraer 195 aircraft in June 2005, plus options on an additional 12 aircraft, making it the type's worldwide launch customer. This was followed in the same month by the conversion of four existing Bombardier Dash 8 Q400 options into firm orders, bringing its fleet of Q400s to 45 when delivered. Flybe received its first 118-seat Embraer 195 in September 2006, and the aircraft began to replace its existing BAe 146s, completing the fleet rationalisation started in 2003. The E-195s were fitted with a Head-up Guidance System (HGS) and configured to offer single-class service.

In 2018, Flybe completed a review of its future fleet, the Bombardier Q400 would remain its core aircraft; all nine of its E195 aircraft would be withdrawn by 2020 but a number of E175s would be retained for busier routes. On 3 April 2019, Flybe confirmed its intention to withdraw six of its E195s in 2019 and the remainder in 2020; its bases at Cardiff and Doncaster would be closed and these destinations served by Q400s from other bases.

The last Embraer 195 was retired and returned to its lessor on 24 February 2020.

Historical fleet
Flybe had in the past operated a wide variety of aircraft, including:

 
 BAe 146
 Boeing 737-300
 Bombardier CRJ200
 Britten-Norman Islander
 de Havilland Canada Dash 8-300
 de Havilland Canada Dash 8 Q400
 de Havilland Canada DHC-6 Twin Otter
 Douglas DC-3 – two inherited from Intra Airways in 1979, both sold in 1980.
 Embraer EMB 110 Bandeirante
 Embraer ERJ 145
 Embraer 175
 Embraer 195
 Fokker F27
 Handley Page Dart Herald – inherited from Express Air Services in 1979 and returned to Express Air Services in 1980 when it left the partnership.
 Saab 340
 Short 330
 Short 360
 Vickers Viscount

Accidents and incidents
On 1 August 2008 an Embraer 190-200LR from Manchester to Belfast suffered a failure of the No. 1 Air Cycle Machine (ACM), releasing smoke and fumes into the aircraft.  A Mayday was declared and an expeditious diversion was carried out.  After donning oxygen masks the pilots of Flybe flight BE484 had great difficulty communicating with each other, ATC and cabin crew, because of technical problems with the masks.  During the emergency evacuation the right overwing emergency exit door became jammed and unusable. Passengers who evacuated via the left overwing exit were unaware of how to get from the wing down to the ground. Several recommendations were made as a result of this incident.
On 21 July 2012 a Flybe aircraft with 47 passengers on board from Newquay to Edinburgh made an emergency landing and was evacuated at Edinburgh after a short circuit in a smoke detector triggered a fire alarm. The Air Accidents Investigation Branch noted pilots initiated a checklist inappropriately for the false alarm, causing depressurisation of the cabin, loss of displays on the copilot side and disconnection of the autopilot. Flybe retrained their pilots and took action to eradicate future false alarms from similar short circuits.
On 10 November 2017 a Flybe De Havilland Canada Dash 8 suffered a nose gear failure after takeoff from Belfast City Airport to Inverness Airport, diverting to Belfast International Airport and landing on its nose. The underside of the nose, forward pressure bulkhead, and the nose gear and its doors were all damaged and there were two injuries. The accident was caused by a faulty sensor causing the doors to close onto the gear while it retracted. Flybe inspected their entire fleet. The Air Accident Investigation Branch noted the aircraft and landing gear manufacturers were already working on a revised design prior to the accident.
On 11 January 2018 a Flybe Bombardier Dash 8 Q400 flying to Glasgow Airport made an unintentional descent due to an incorrect autopilot setting shortly after departing Belfast City Airport. The plane descended from 1,500 feet to 928 feet over eighteen seconds reaching a maximum rate of descent of 4,300 feet per minute. Flybe revised their simulator training and pre-takeoff checklists in response.
On 28 February 2019 a Flybe Embraer 195 destined for Alicante aborted takeoff and evacuated on the runway at Exeter Airport after the copilot noticed smoke from an air conditioning vent before fumes began entering the aircraft. The evacuation left a passenger and a member of cabin crew injured. The rapid engine shutdown meant wing flaps were not correctly positioned for evacuation, leaving a large drop for those attempting to use overwing exits, some of whom reentered the cabin and evacuated via slides. The Air Accidents Investigation Branch made recommendations to the European Union Aviation Safety Agency and the Federal Aviation Administration of the United States proposing changes to the design and layout of emergency exits on commercial aircraft.
On 14 November 2019 a Flybe DHC-8-400 destined for Heathrow Airport made a precautionary emergency landing at Exeter Airport when, shortly after departing from Cornwall Airport Newquay, the flight crew noticed their handwheels required significant offsets to maintain level flight. The Air Accidents Investigation Branch concluded that a broken left aileron cable was responsible, and also discovered that the right aileron on the aircraft and others in the fleet sometimes failed to respond to handwheel inputs. Although Flybe ceased operations before the probe concluded, airlines and the plane's manufacturer made changes to design and maintenance. The report also criticised the use of irreversible filters, banned in the United States, on the flight data recorder resulting in the loss of relevant data.

References

Citations

Bibliography

External links

Defunct airlines of the United Kingdom
Airlines established in 1979
Airlines disestablished in 2020
British Air Transport Association
British brands
Defunct European low-cost airlines
European Regions Airline Association
Companies based in Exeter
1979 establishments in England
2020 disestablishments in England
British companies established in 1979
British companies disestablished in 2020
Regional airline brands
Virgin Group
Companies that have entered administration in the United Kingdom
Airlines disestablished due to the COVID-19 pandemic